John Weston may refer to:

Politicians
John Weston (MP for New Shoreham) (fl.1446-7)
John de Weston, MP for Derby (UK Parliament constituency)
John Weston (MP fl.1339), MP for Derby (UK Parliament constituency)
John Weston (died c. 1433), MP for Worcester, Worcestershire and Warwick
John Weston (1651–1712), MP for Guildford and Surrey
John Weston (Canadian politician) (born 1958), Canadian MP for West Vancouver—Sunshine Coast—Sea to Sky Country
Sir John Weston, 1st Baronet (1852–1926), British MP for Kendal, 1913–1918 and Westmorland, 1918–1924
John Kael Weston, American diplomat, author, and politician

Others
John Weston (aviator) (1872–1950), aviation pioneer in South Africa
John Weston (businessman), British businessman
John Weston (diplomat) (born 1938), British diplomat
John Weston (footballer) (1900–1984), English association football player
John Weston (RAF officer) (1908–1979), signals officer in the Royal Air Force
John F. Weston (1845–1917), United States Army general and Medal of Honor recipient
John Harley Weston (born 1967), Scottish-born Australian singer-songwriter
John Weston, fictional character in the TV series In the Flesh